Her Market Value is a 1925 American silent melodrama film directed by Paul Powell and starring Agnes Ayres. Powell produced the picture and distributed through Producers Distributing Corporation.

Plot
As described in a film magazine review, unwise investments wipe out Dumont, formerly a wealthy man. He drowns himself and three estate trustees discuss the penniless wife. They “invest” $30,000 in her and she uses the money to pay off her husband’s debts. The three men then vie for Nancy’s hand, but Davis, learning her true market value, finally buys out the others and gets Nancy’s love and hand in the bargain.

Cast

Preservation
A print of Her Market Value is held at UCLA Film and Television Archive.

References

External links

1925 films
American silent feature films
Films directed by Paul Powell (director)
1925 drama films
Silent American drama films
American black-and-white films
Producers Distributing Corporation films
Melodrama films
1920s American films